Román Alex Strada (born 16 August 1987) is a retired Argentine professional footballer who played as a midfielder.

Career
Strada played for Chacarita Juniors' youth, before featuring at senior level with Matienzo de Monte Buey. Then came a move to Torneo Argentino A's Alumni. He netted nine goals in two seasons with them, most notably notching a brace against Estudiantes on 2 December 2010. Fellow tier three side Talleres loaned Strada in June 2011. Five goals in twenty-three matches followed, prior to the midfielder joining Santamarina on 31 July 2012. He scored two goals in his first three starts, which were the first of twelve for the club over three years. His last strike came versus Douglas Haig, who then signed Strada in 2015.

He departed Douglas Haig at the conclusion of the 2016 Primera B Nacional. After stints with Guillermo Brown (2016–17) and Quilmes (2017–18), Strada joined fellow Primera B Nacional side Mitre in June 2018. He made his club debut on 26 August against Platense, a match Mitre won 0–1. After a spell at Sportivo Belgrano, Strada retired in September 2021.

Career statistics
.

Honours
Santamarina
Torneo Argentino A: 2013–14

References

External links

1987 births
Living people
Sportspeople from Córdoba Province, Argentina
Argentine footballers
Association football midfielders
Torneo Argentino A players
Primera Nacional players
Alumni de Villa María players
Talleres de Córdoba footballers
Club y Biblioteca Ramón Santamarina footballers
Club Atlético Douglas Haig players
Guillermo Brown footballers
Quilmes Atlético Club footballers
Club Atlético Mitre footballers
Sportivo Belgrano footballers